Morais Tarwuo Waylee (born 1955) is a Liberian politician and lawyer who represented Grand Gedeh's Konobo District in the Liberian House of Representatives from 2012 to 2018. He is a member of the Unity Party.

References 

Living people
Unity Party (Liberia) politicians
People from Grand Gedeh County
1955 births
Date of birth missing (living people)